Sir James Hopwood Jeans  (11 September 187716 September 1946) was an English physicist, astronomer and mathematician.

Early life
Born in Ormskirk, Lancashire, the son of William Tulloch Jeans, a parliamentary correspondent and author. Jeans was educated at Merchant Taylors' School, Wilson's Grammar School, Camberwell and Trinity College, Cambridge.
As a gifted student, Jeans was counselled to take an aggressive approach to the Cambridge Mathematical Tripos competition:

Career
Jeans was elected Fellow of Trinity College in October 1901, and taught at Cambridge, but went to Princeton University in 1904 as a professor of applied mathematics. He returned to Cambridge in 1910.

He made important contributions in many areas of physics, including quantum theory, the theory of radiation and stellar evolution. His analysis of rotating bodies led him to conclude that Pierre-Simon Laplace's theory that the solar system formed from a single cloud of gas was incorrect, proposing instead that the planets condensed from material drawn out of the sun by a hypothetical catastrophic near-collision with a passing star. This theory is not accepted today.

Jeans, along with Arthur Eddington, is a founder of British cosmology. In 1928, Jeans was the first to conjecture a steady state cosmology based on a hypothesized continuous creation of matter in the universe. In his book Astronomy and Cosmology (1928) he stated: "The type of conjecture which presents itself, somewhat insistently, is that the centers of the nebulae are of the nature 'singular points' at which matter is poured into our universe from some other, and entirely extraneous spatial dimension, so that, to a denizen of our universe, they appear as points at which matter is being continually created." This theory fell out of favour when the 1965 discovery of the cosmic microwave background was widely interpreted as the tell-tale signature of the Big Bang.

His scientific reputation is grounded in the monographs The Dynamical Theory of Gases (1904), Theoretical Mechanics (1906), and Mathematical Theory of Electricity and Magnetism (1908). After retiring in 1929, he wrote a number of books for the lay public, including The Stars in Their Courses (1931), The Universe Around Us, Through Space and Time (1934), The New Background of Science (1933), and The Mysterious Universe.  These books made Jeans fairly well known as an expositor of the revolutionary scientific discoveries of his day, especially in relativity and physical cosmology.

In 1939, the Journal of the British Astronomical Association reported that Jeans was going to stand as a candidate for parliament for the Cambridge University constituency. The election, expected to take place in 1939 or 1940, did not take place until 1945, and without his involvement.

He also wrote the book Physics and Philosophy (1943) where he explores the different views on reality from two different perspectives: science and philosophy.  On his religious views, Jeans was an agnostic Freemason.

Personal life
Jeans married twice, first to the American poet Charlotte Tiffany Mitchell in 1907, who died, and then to the Austrian organist and harpsichordist Suzanne Hock (better known as Susi Jeans) in 1935. Susi and Jeans had three children: George, Christopher, and Catherine. 

At Merchant Taylors' School there is a James Jeans Academic Scholarship for the candidate in the entrance exams who displays outstanding results across the spectrum of subjects, notably in mathematics and the sciences.

Major accomplishments
One of Jeans' major discoveries, named Jeans length, is a critical radius of an interstellar cloud in space. It depends on the temperature, and density of the cloud, and the mass of the particles composing the cloud. A cloud that is smaller than its Jeans length will not have sufficient gravity to overcome the repulsive gas pressure forces and condense to form a star, whereas a cloud that is larger than its Jeans length will collapse.

Jeans came up with another version of this equation, called Jeans mass or Jeans instability, that solves for the critical mass a cloud must attain before being able to collapse.

Jeans also helped to discover the Rayleigh–Jeans law, which relates the energy density of black-body radiation to the temperature of the emission source.

Jeans is also credited with calculating the rate of atmospheric escape from a planet due to kinetic energy of the gas molecules, a process known as Jeans Escape.

Idealism

In an interview published in The Observer (London), when asked the question "Do you believe that life on this planet is the result of some sort of accident, or do you believe that it is a part of some great scheme?", he replied:

Awards and honours
 Fellow of the Royal Society in May 1906
 Bakerian Lecture to Royal Society in 1917.
 Royal Medal of the Royal Society in 1919.
 Hopkins Prize of the Cambridge Philosophical Society 1921–1924.
 Gold Medal of the Royal Astronomical Society in 1922.
 He was knighted in 1928.
 Franklin Medal of the Franklin Institute in 1931.
 In 1933 Jeans was invited to deliver the Royal Institution Christmas Lecture on Through Space and Time.
 Mukerjee Medal of the Indian Association for the Cultivation of Science in 1937.
 President of the 25th session of the Indian Science Congress in 1938.
 Calcutta Medal of the Indian Science Congress Association in 1938.
 Lorimer Medal of the Astronomical Society of Edinburgh in 1938  for which he gave the Lorimer Lecture: The Depths of Space.
 Member of the Order of Merit in 1939.
 The crater Jeans on the Moon is named after him, as is the crater Jeans on Mars.
 The String Quartet No.7 by Robert Simpson was written in tribute to him on the centenary of his birth, 1977.

Bibliography

References

Sources

 (quoting Jeans, The Mysterious Universe, p. 134).

External links

 
 Britannica article includes photo
 

Works of Jeans available online from the Internet Archive
1904. The Dynamical Theory of Gases
1906. Theoretical Mechanics
1908. Mathematical Theory of Electricity and Magnetism
1947. The Growth of Physical Science

1877 births
1946 deaths
20th-century English mathematicians
Alumni of Trinity College, Cambridge
British agnostics
20th-century British astronomers
British physicists
English agnostics
English Freemasons
English physicists
Fellows of the Royal Society
Fellows of Trinity College, Cambridge
Fluid dynamicists
Idealists
Knights Bachelor
Members of the Order of Merit
Ontologists
People educated at Merchant Taylors' School, Northwood
People educated at Wilson's School, Wallington
People from Ormskirk
Philosophers of mathematics
Philosophers of mind
Philosophers of science
Presidents of the British Science Association
Presidents of the Royal Astronomical Society
Princeton University faculty
Recipients of the Gold Medal of the Royal Astronomical Society
Royal Medal winners
Second Wranglers